The 2023 Food City Dirt Race is an upcoming NASCAR Cup Series race that will be held on April 9, 2023, at Bristol Motor Speedway in Bristol, Tennessee. It is contested over 250 laps on the  short track, it will be the eighth race of the 2023 NASCAR Cup Series season.

Report

Background
Bristol Motor Speedway, formerly known as Bristol International Raceway and Bristol Raceway, is a NASCAR short track venue located in Bristol, Tennessee. Constructed in 1960, it held its first NASCAR race on July 30, 1961. Bristol is among the most popular tracks on the NASCAR schedule because of its distinct features, which include extraordinarily steep banking combined with short length, an all concrete surface, two pit roads, and stadium-like seating.

In 2021, the race shifted to a dirt surface version of the track and was renamed the Food City Dirt Race.

Entry list
 (R) denotes rookie driver.
 (i) denotes driver who is ineligible for series driver points.

Media

Television
The Food City Dirt Race will be carried by Fox in the United States. Mike Joy, Clint Bowyer and three-time NASCAR Cup Series champion and co-owner of Stewart-Haas Racing Tony Stewart will call the race from the broadcast booth. Jamie Little and Regan Smith will handle pit road for the television side. Larry McReynolds provided insight from the Fox Sports studio in Charlotte.

Radio
PRN will have the radio call for the race which will be simulcasted on Sirius XM NASCAR Radio. Doug Rice and Mark Garrow will call the race in the booth when the field raced down the frontstretch. Rob Albright will call the race from atop the turn 3 suites when the field raced down the backstretch. Brad Gillie, Brett McMillan, Lenny Batycki and Wendy Venturini will cover the action on pit lane for PRN.

References

Food City Dirt Race
Food City Dirt Race
Food City Dirt Race
NASCAR races at Bristol Motor Speedway